David Law Kemper (born 1947/8 in Chicago, Illinois) is an American rock drummer who was a member of the Jerry Garcia Band (1983–1994) and Bob Dylan's band (1996–2001).

He was with the Jerry Garcia Band from 1983 until January 1994, when he was suddenly dismissed for reasons still unknown to him. He went on to spend five years as Bob Dylan's drummer. Kemper joined Dutch progressive rock band Focus from 1975 to 1977, playing both on the Mother Focus album and tour. He has played with Mike Stinson, Elkie Brooks, Dennis Wilson (on the Bambu sessions) and Bernie Leadon. He played double drums with Jim Gordon on Barry McGuire's "Don't Blame God" from his Lighten Up album in 1974.

References

Living people
Bob Dylan
1947 births
Musicians from Chicago
20th-century American drummers
American male drummers
Jerry Garcia Band members
Focus (band) members
Jerry Garcia Acoustic Band members
JGB (band) members